Zombie Night is a 2013 American zombie horror film directed by John Gulager, written by Keith Allan and Delondra Williams from a story by Richard Schenkman, and starring Anthony Michael Hall, Daryl Hannah, Jennifer Taylor, Alan Ruck, and Shirley Jones.

Plot 
In a small California town, two families must survive a zombie attack until sunrise.

Cast
 Anthony Michael Hall as Patrick Jackson 
 Daryl Hannah as Birdy Lincoln-Jackson 
 Alan Ruck as Joe Madden 
 Rachel G. Fox as Tracie Jackson
 Shirley Jones as Nana Barbara Lincoln 
 Jennifer Taylor as Karin Madden
 Daniel Ross Owen as Perry Madden 
 Gibson Bobby Sjobeck as Nathan Madden
 Zoe Canner as Irina
 Tia Robinson as Janice
 Rogelio T. Ramos as Officer Vincent Lopez
 Diane Ayala Goldner as Officer Johnson
 Hayley Derryberry as Bloody Woman
 Destiny Hernandez as Teresa
 Keith Allan (as Keith Allen) as Looter
 Esteban Cueto as Grounds Keeper
 Jordan James Smith as Jared
 Meg Rutenberg as Rachel
 James Mullen Henderson as Desperate Man
 Jane Osborn as Desperate Woman
 Nicholas S. Williams as Churchgoer
 Daniel Moorehead as Dizzy
 Bryan R. Glaser as Bryan
 David Hill as Police Officer
 Diane Chambers as Decaying Old Woman In Cemetery

Production 
Director John Gulager used amputees to portray zombies.  He cited special effects as one of the highlights of a zombie film.

Release 
Zombie Night premiered on Syfy on October 26, 2013, and it was released on DVD on December 10, 2013.

Reception 
Michael Storey of the Arkansas Democrat-Gazette called it a sub-par zombie film that lacks humor or camp.  Brian Lowry of Variety called it "a brain-dead exploitation pic" that is "an almost comically amateurish effort".  Andrew Dowler of Now wrote, "Zombie Night brings enough energy, skill and gore to its basic Night Of The Living Dead story to provide light entertainment on a chilly night."

References

External links 
 

2013 television films
2013 films
2013 horror films
2013 independent films
American horror television films
American zombie films
Syfy original films
The Asylum films
Films directed by John Gulager
2010s English-language films
2010s American films